Since inception in 2005, there have been 13 clubs who have played in the A-League Men. Eight clubs have won the A-League Men Premiership, they are Sydney FC (4 times), Melbourne Victory (3 times), Adelaide United (2 times), Brisbane Roar (2 times), Central Coast Mariners (2 times), Melbourne City (2 times), Perth Glory (once) and Western Sydney Wanderers (once)

Performance record and ranking of clubs according to best result 

 Team names in bold indicates the club is a current A-League Men member.

Source: A-League Men

See also
 List of Australian soccer champions

References

A-League Men records and statistics
A-League Men lists